Vidyagiri (Literally means "Hill of Knowledge" Vidya - Knowledge Giri - Hill in kannada language) is a small locality located in the eastern part of Dharwad city in India. Vidyagiri is known for its educational institutions located on the top of its hill. It is home to Janata Shikshan Samithi (JSS) campus of chain of educational centers, schools & colleges.

Etymology
In Kannada language the meaning of "Vidyagiri" is "Hill of knowledge" if split, Vidya means knowledge & Giri means hill. It is called so because of the number of educational centres.

Educational institutions
JSS Banashankari Arts, Commerce & S.K.Gubbi Science College
Dr. D Veerendra Heggade Institute of Management Studies and Research
JSS Public School
Shri Manjunatheshwar Pre University College (SMPU)
JSS RS Hukkerikar Science, Arts and Commerce college
JSS Shri Manjunatheshwar Central School
JSS College of Education (B.ed)
S.K Gubbi College science college
JSS KH Kabbur Institute of Engineering College
JSS Shri Manjunatheshwar ITI College
R.S Hukkerikar College of Engineering
Dr. D Veerendra Heggade Institute of Management Studies and Research

Religious places

The Vidyagiri locality has numerous religious sites.
Mailarlingeshwar Temple
Mailarlingeshwar Temple at Mailarling Hill, Vidyagiri is one of the oldest temple in the city of Dharwad, It is dedicated to Hinduism with the idol of lord Shiva in the shrine of the temple, the temple was renovated in 2007 the temple is at the elevation of 844m from the sea level.
Shankar Mutt, Vidyagiri

Sri Sringeri Shankar Math at Vidyagiri is one of the most popular mathas in Dharwad and North Karnataka region. The mutt was built in 1984 and it is one of the branches of the Sri Sri Jagadguru Shankaracharya Mahasamsthanam of Shringeri.

Location

Residential areas
Vidyagiri intakes few smaller residential areas as Daneshwari Nagar in the north and Vivekananda Nagar in the south joint with Rajatgiri which is a part of Gandhinagar.

References

External links 
 Vidyagiri
 Dharwad

Cities and towns in Dharwad district
Neighborhoods in Dharwad
Schools in Dharwad district